Donella Burridge (born 31 May 1958) is a former synchronised swimmer from Australia.

References 

1958 births
Living people
Australian synchronised swimmers
Olympic synchronised swimmers of Australia
Synchronized swimmers at the 1984 Summer Olympics